Cartoon Saloon is an Irish animation film, short film and television studio based in Kilkenny which provides film TV and short film services. The studio is best known for its animated feature films The Secret of Kells, Song of the Sea, The Breadwinner and Wolfwalkers. Their works have received five Academy Award nominations, their first four feature length works all received nominations for Best Animated Feature and one for Best Animated Short Film (Late Afternoon). The company also developed the cartoon series Skunk Fu!, Puffin Rock, Dorg Van Dango and Viking Skool. As of 2020, the studio employs 300 animators.

History
Cartoon Saloon was established in Kilkenny during 1999 by Tomm Moore, Nora Twomey, and Paul Young. The three were all alumni of the Ballyfermot College of Further Education’s animation degree course. Cartoon Saloon began working on a trailer for its first feature film, The Secret of Kells, that same year.  However, the film did not enter full production until 2005; the company animated corporate work such as advertisements as they searched for funding.  Meanwhile the studio of 12 animators relied on commercial and corporate work including web-site design and CD ROM production with Paul Young focusing on illustration whilst Tomm Moore undertook the animation.

Both The Secret of Kells and the studio’s second feature Song of the Sea were inspired by The Thief and the Cobbler and Mulan while the founders were in university. Tomm Moore, the director of both films, said "Some friends in college and I were inspired by Richard Williams' unfinished masterpiece The Thief and the Cobbler and the Disney movie Mulan, which took indigenous traditional art as the starting point for a beautiful style of 2D animation. I felt that something similar could be done with Irish art." A 2001 meeting with Les Armateurs proved instrumental in the effort to secure funding for The Secret of Kells, and the company helped in the production of the final film. 
 
The success and Oscar nomination of the film in 2009 led to major offers for Cartoon Saloon, but the studio chose to remain independent. This led to a difficult time financially for the company for a few years with the partners having to take out personal loans to keep the studio afloat.

As of 2021, Cartoon Saloon is in production of its TV series, Vikingskool and Nora Twomey's second feature for Netflix,  My Father's Dragon.

The Secret of Kells, Song of the Sea and Wolfwalkers,  based their style on traditional native art, which  had The Thief and the Cobbler cited as one of their main inspirations. Tomm Moore, the director of all three films, said, "Some friends in college and I were inspired by Richard Williams's unfinished masterpiece The Thief and the Cobbler and the Disney movie Mulan, which took indigenous traditional art as the starting point for a beautiful style of 2D animation. I felt that something similar could be done with Irish art."

Services
The studio provides animation, illustration and design services for clients ranging from Disney to BBC to Cartoon Network.

Cartoon Saloon also provided the graphics for the successful Emperor of the Irish exhibition at Trinity College Dublin, in 2014.

Filmography

Feature films

Released films

Upcoming films

Short films

Television series

Rejected pilots

Unproduced feature film

Related works

Cooperative works

Awards and nominations

The Secret of Kells
Wins
 2008: Directors Finders Award at the Directors Finders Series in Ireland
 2009: Audience Award at the Annecy International Animation Film Festival
 2009: Audience Award at the Edinburgh International Film Festival
 2009: Roy E. Disney Award at Seattle's 2D Or Not 2D Film Festival
 2009: Grand Prize at the Seoul International Cartoon and Animation Festival
 2009: Audience Award at the 9th Kecskemét Animation Film Festival; Kecskemét City Prize at the 6th Festival of European Animated Feature Films and TV Specials
 2010: Nominated for Best Animation award at the 7th Irish Film and Television Awards
 2010: European Animated Feature Award at the British Animation Awards

Nominations
 2009: Grand Prix Award for Best Film in the Annecy International Animation Film Festival
 2009: Best Animated Film at the 22nd European Film Awards
 2009: Best Animated Feature at the 37th Annie Awards
 2010: Best Film at the 7th Irish Film and Television Awards
 2010: Best Animated Feature at the 82nd Academy Awards

Song of the Sea

The Breadwinner

Wolfwalkers

My Father's Dragon

Late Afternoon
Nominated for Academy Award for Best Animated Short Film
IFTA Award for Best Animated Short Film
Best Animated Short Film, Baku International Animation Festival

Puffin Rock

See also
Cinema of Ireland
Independent animation
Irish Animation Awards

Notes

References

External links

Irish animation studios
Entertainment companies of Ireland
Mass media companies established in 1999
Irish companies established in 1999
Kilkenny (city)